Thomas Anthony Gilson (1881 – 2 March 1912), sometimes known as Alf Gilson, was an English professional footballer who played as a right back in the Football League for Bristol City, Aston Villa and Clapton Orient.

Personal life 
After suffering from a chest condition which forced his retirement from football in September 1910, Gilson spent time recovering in Bournemouth, before returning home to Kingswood in February 1912. He then fell unconscious and died from pneumonia and pleurisy one month later.

Honours 
Bristol City
 Football League Second Division (1): 1905–06
 Gloucestershire Cup (1): 1903–04
Wycombe Wanderers
 Berks & Bucks Senior Cup (2): 1908–09, 1909–10
 Berks & Bucks Charity Cup (1): 1909–10

Career statistics

References

English footballers
Brentford F.C. players
English Football League players
Association football fullbacks
1912 deaths
Burton Swifts F.C. players
Aston Villa F.C. players
Bristol City F.C. players
Leyton Orient F.C. players
Southern Football League players
Wycombe Wanderers F.C. players
1881 births
Sportspeople from Aylesbury
Deaths from pneumonia in England
Footballers from Buckinghamshire